Walter Eric Spear FRSE PhD FRS FInstP (20 January 1921 – 21 February 2008) was a German physicist noted for his pioneering work to help develop large area electronics and thin film displays. He was born in Frankfurt to a Jewish father and a Lutheran mother; by the time he finished his school examinations in 1938 life for Jews and people associated with Jews was becoming difficult.  With the support of friends and relatives in Britain, the family were able to move to London, where he arrived in 1938 "with a small suitcase and a large cello".

Education
Wanting to pursue a scientific career, Spear attended evening classes for the University of London entrance examination, which he passed before the family were interned on the Isle of Man as suspected Axis sympathisers. They were soon released, and Spear joined the Royal Pioneer Corps in 1940, later moving to the Royal Artillery where he became a Bombardier before being demobilized in 1946.

After returning to London he took an External London Physics Degree at Regent Street Polytechnic. Following graduation he began work on a PhD at Birkbeck College London in the Crystallography Research Department under Werner Ehrenberg; due to lack of financial support they had to cobble together their own equipment or use captured German apparatus.

Career
Spear graduated in 1950, but obtained a Research Fellowship that allowed him to stay there to do additional work. He left Birkbeck in 1953 to take up a position at University College, Leicester, where he did research on amorphous selenium films.

One of his PhD students at Leicester was Alf Adams, the British physicist who invented the strained-layer quantum-well laser. Walter Spear left Leicester in 1968 after being offered the Harris Chair of Physics at the University of Dundee.

It was while working at Leicester that Spear first came into contact with a student named Peter LeComber with whom he would work closely throughout his career. LeComber came with Spear to Dundee, and together they would become famed for their joint research into the properties of amorphous silicon.

The work carried out by Spear and LeComber and their research team in this field drew great interest and led to the creation of the amorphous film silicon transistor. It was this innovation that directly led to LCD technology and to the eventual development of technologies such as flat screen TVs and solar panels. While at Dundee they also established the Amorphous Materials Research Group which was devoted to the study of non-crystalline solids.

When Walter Spear retired in 1988 he was succeeded in the Harris Chair by Peter LeComber. However LeComber died suddenly in 1992. LeComber's death effectively marked the end of Spear's active research career.

Awards and honours
In 1972 Spear was made a Fellow of the Royal Society of Edinburgh, in 1976 he was awarded the Europhysics Prize of the European Physical Society and in 1977 the Max Born Medal by the Institute of Physics. In 1980 he was elected a Fellow of the Royal Society of London and awarded the Makdougall Brisbane Prize of the Royal Society of Edinburgh. In 1988 he was awarded the Rank Prize, and the same year presented the Royal Society Bakerian Lecture. In 1990 he was awarded their Rumford Medal, and he retired soon afterwards. His nomination for the Royal Society reads 

Walter Spear's archives are held by Archive Services, University of Dundee. As well as including academic works by Spear and notes for talks and lectures, they include Spear's ‘Scientific Curiosities and Absurdities’ file which features some of the more unusual correspondence Spear received.

Personal 
His mother, born Eva Reineck, was the daughter of a Lutheran pastor:  she became well-known in Frankfurt and a professional violinist and teacher.   He himself inherited a seventeenth century Italian ‘cello while still a boy.   He had received 'cello lessons from the age of 8, and was a talented amateur cellist throughout his adult life.   His father, David Spear, was a graphic artist who later became a pioneering photographer.

Walter Spear was survived by his widow, born Hilda D. King, whom he had married in Middlesex in 1952, by the couple's two daughters and by their grandchildren.

References 

1921 births
2008 deaths
Academics of the University of Dundee
Academics of the University of Leicester
Academics of Birkbeck, University of London
Alumni of Birkbeck, University of London
Jewish scientists
Fellows of the Royal Society
Fellows of the Royal Society of Edinburgh
British Army personnel of World War II
Royal Pioneer Corps soldiers
Royal Artillery soldiers
German emigrants to the United Kingdom